Itwari is a railway station, junction, and terminus about 5 km from Nagpur railway station in Maharashtra state of India.

A few trains also terminate at this station.  It is also a narrow-gauge line railway junction.  The station code is ITR and is managed by South East Central Railway. 3 long-distance trains which starts from and terminates at Itwari instead of Nagpur are Itwari Junction–Tatanagar passenger, Bilaspur–Itwari Intercity Superfast Express & Shivnath Express. One new train Rewa-Itwari-Rewa Exp via Jabalpur-Nainpur-Balaghat-Gondia has been introduced. Itwari is among the five small stations which fall within the extended city limits of Nagpur along with Ajni, Kalamna, Kamptee and Khapri.

One of the few existing narrow-gauge lines of the Satpura Railway, the Nainpur–Chhindwara–Itwari line terminates here.

Further, the area around Itwari railway station is also known as Itwari Locality of Nagpur.

References 

Railway stations in Nagpur district
Transport in Nagpur
Nagpur
Nagpur SEC railway division